Bridgewater College is a private liberal-arts college in Bridgewater, Virginia. Established in 1880, Bridgewater College admitted both men and women from the time of its founding and was the first four-year liberal arts college in Virginia to do so.  Approximately 1,800 students are enrolled.

History

Bridgewater College was established in 1880 as Spring Creek Normal and Collegiate Institute by Daniel Christian Flory. Nine years later, the school was named Bridgewater College and chartered by the Commonwealth of Virginia to grant undergraduate degrees. Bridgewater conferred its first Bachelor of Arts degree on June 1, 1891. In 1895, the Chairman of the Faculty, Walter B. Yount, a graduate of what would become Juniata College and the University of Virginia was named the college's first President. After his retirement in 1910, John S. Flory (an early Bridgewater graduate who also received degrees from other institution and had served on the faculty and as vice-president) succeeded him as the college's president.

Bridgewater College became the first senior co-educational liberal arts college in Virginia and one of the few accredited colleges of its type in the South.

The oldest portion of the Bridgewater College campus, consisting of five fine brick collegiate buildings constructed before 1911, is included in the Bridgewater Historic District.  It was listed on the National Register of Historic Places in 1984.

2022 shooting 

On February 1, 2022, 55-year-old campus police officer John Painter and 48-year-old campus safety officer J.J. Jefferson were shot and killed on campus after being called to investigate a suspicious person on campus. The shooter, a 27-year-old former student named Alexander Wyatt Campbell, was later apprehended after a manhunt and suffered a gunshot injury at some point during the incident.

Campus

Bridgewater College is located in the Shenandoah Valley of Virginia.

Students can choose to be involved in approximately 60 social, cultural, religious, and academic clubs and organizations on campus. In addition, the student-run Eagle Productions hosts a wide variety of free weekend activities available to students. Events range from comedians and musicians to Homecoming festivities and the Springfest Carnival.

The nearby cities of Harrisonburg, Staunton, and Charlottesville provide numerous arts and cultural opportunities for students, while the Washington, D.C., metropolitan area is only a two-hour drive away. Civil War battlefields, national parks, agriculture, and restaurants featuring local food are all part of the culture of the Shenandoah Valley, bounded by the Allegheny Mountains to the west and the Blue Ridge chain to the east, both of which are visible from campus.

Academics
Bridgewater offers more than 60 majors and minors, awarding the Bachelor of Arts and Bachelor of Science degrees. Bridgewater students have the opportunity to study abroad through the BCA Study Abroad program and May Term Travel Courses.

Bridgewater also offers the Flory Honors Program. Flory Fellows gain access to many opportunities and benefits, including honors sections of general education courses limited to 15 students each, housing within the honors community, and more.

Bridgewater began offering its first masters program in Athletic Training for the 2017–2018 school year, and now offers a Master of Arts in Digital Media Strategy for the 2018–2019 school year. Bridgewater College hopes to include more graduate programs in the future. Bridgewater was ranked #229 in National Liberal arts colleges based on U.S. News Report

Student life

Traditions 
Annual events at Bridgewater College celebrate tradition, community, alumni, and culture. Founder's Day observance at Bridgewater commemorates the April 3, 1854, birth of Daniel Christian Flory, who began Bridgewater College in 1880, at the age of 26.

Homecoming weekend in October welcomes alumni back to the college with class reunions, outdoor festivities, a home football game and the annual Athletic Hall of Fame banquet.

Senior Week is the week before graduation, in which seniors celebrate with several organized events. Oracles at the Oak was a tradition originally carried out by the senior classes during the early to mid 1900s underneath an oak tree on campus. Students met to pledge their dedication to the school and to each other. After the lightning-damaged oak tree was cut down, the tradition subsided. However, the class of 2008 rekindled this tradition with the help of the Bridgewater College Alumni Association. The end of senior week is marked with the Bridgewater Ball, a formal dinner and dance usually held in nearby Harrisonburg.

Athletics 

Bridgewater College is a Division III member of the National Collegiate Athletic Association (NCAA) and follows guidelines and policies set forth by this governing body. The teams are members of the Old Dominion Athletic Conference (ODAC), which has 14 member institutions.

Bridgewater College sponsors 22 NCAA intercollegiate sports, which include baseball, basketball, cross country, football, golf, lacrosse, soccer, tennis, indoor track, and outdoor track for men, and basketball, cross country, field hockey, golf, lacrosse, softball, soccer, tennis, indoor track, outdoor track, volleyball and swimming for women. Additionally, the athletic program supports cheerleading, a dance team and pep band, which perform at home football and basketball games. Bridgewater College also has an interactive Athletic Hall of Fame located in Nininger Hall to honor those who, by outstanding achievement in athletics at the college and service thereafter, have made lasting contributions in the community, government, church and/or workplace.

Club sports on campus also include Co-Ed ultimate frisbee and a men's league rugby union team.

Notable people

Alumni 
 G. Steven Agee, former Justice of the Supreme Court of Virginia and now a Judge on the United States Court of Appeals for the Fourth Circuit
 Pasco Middleton Bowman II, Senior federal judge on the United States Court of Appeals for the Eighth Circuit
 David Branshaw, professional golfer.
 Ray Bussard, former National Championship (1978) winning Men's Swim Coach at University of Tennessee from 1968 to 1989
 Moses H. W. Chan, Physicist elected to the National Academy of Sciences in 2000
 Wolfgang Drechsler, German social scientist and government adviser
 Phil Eyler, Canadian politician
 Jacob A. Garber, U.S. Representative, 1929-1931
 Nathan H. Miller, politician
 Richard D. Obenshain, politician

Faculty 
 Carl Bowman, sociologist

References

External links
 Official website
 Official athletics website

 
Private universities and colleges in Virginia
Universities and colleges affiliated with the Church of the Brethren
Educational institutions established in 1880
Universities and colleges accredited by the Southern Association of Colleges and Schools
Education in Rockingham County, Virginia
Buildings and structures in Rockingham County, Virginia
1880 establishments in Virginia